Wojciech Hajda (born 23 May 2000) is a Polish professional footballer who plays as a midfielder for I liga club Puszcza Niepołomice.

References

External links

2000 births
Sportspeople from Bytom
Sportspeople from Silesian Voivodeship
Living people
Polish footballers
Poland youth international footballers
Association football midfielders
Górnik Zabrze players
OKS Stomil Olsztyn players
Sandecja Nowy Sącz players
Puszcza Niepołomice players
Ekstraklasa players
I liga players
III liga players